Up In A Heaval is a fantasy novel by British-American writer Piers Anthony, the twenty-sixth book of the Xanth series.

Plot

Characters  
Umlaut
Sesame
Magician Humfrey
Demoness Metria
Sammy Cat
The Demon Jupiter

References

External links

 26
2002 American novels
Tor Books books